Yeyen Tumena (born 16 May 1976) is an Indonesian footballer and manager who previously plays as defender for Persma Manado, Persija Jakarta, Persikota Tangerang, Persebaya Surabaya, Perseden Denpasar, PSMS Medan, PSM Makassar and the Indonesia national team.

Career

Tumena started his career with PSM Makassar.

Club statistics

Honours

Club
PSM Makassar
 Liga Indonesia Premier Division: 1999–2000

Persebaya Surabaya
 Liga Indonesia Premier Division: 2004

References

1976 births
Association football defenders
Living people
Minangkabau people
Indonesian footballers
Indonesia international footballers
Persebaya Surabaya players
Perseden Denpasar players
Persikota Tangerang players
Persija Jakarta players
Persma Manado players
PSM Makassar players
PSMS Medan players
Indonesian Premier Division players
People from Padang
Sportspeople from West Sumatra